Annie Marie Leonard (born 1964) is an American proponent of sustainability and a critic of consumerism. She created the animated film The Story of Stuff (2007), which describes the life cycle of material goods. In 2014, she became the Executive Director of Greenpeace USA.

Biography

Early life and education
Leonard was born in Seattle, Washington, where she also grew up. She graduated from the Lakeside School, and received an undergraduate degree from Barnard College in 1987 and a graduate degree from Cornell University in City and Regional Planning.

Career
After interning at the National Wildlife Federation in the late 1980s, Leonard began working with Greenpeace on a campaign to ban international waste dumping, traveling around the world to track  garbage and hazardous waste sent from developed to less developed countries. "I was sneaking into the factories where it was being disposed, interviewing the workers, taking hair samples and soil samples to prove the environmental health harm," she later explained in an interview with Cornell University.

In 1992, she testified in front of the US Congress on the topic of international waste trafficking. The work of Greenpeace and other organizations led to the 1992 Basel Convention, an international treaty to protect less developed countries from the dumping of hazardous waste by transnational corporations based in developed countries.

Leonard is best known as the creator and narrator of the animated documentary about the life cycle of material goods, The Story of Stuff (2007). The documentary began as an hour-long talk and was made into a condensed film version based on popular demand. She also wrote a book version of the film, published in 2010 in the United States by Free Press of Simon & Schuster, in the UK by Constable & Robinson, and in Germany by Econ Verlag.

After The Story of Stuff, she created The Story of Cap and Trade (2009), which addresses emissions trading. Subsequent productions include The Story of Bottled Water, The Story of Cosmetics, The Story of Electronics, The Story of Citizens United v. FEC, The Story of Broke, The Story of Change, and The Story of Solutions.

In addition to her work on the Story of Stuff films, Leonard was co-creator and coordinator of GAIA (the Global Alliance for Incinerator Alternatives), serving on the boards of International Forum on Globalization (IFG) and the Environmental Health Fund. She previously worked for Health Care Without Harm, Essential Information, and Greenpeace International, and was coordinator of the Funders Workgroup for Sustainable Production and Consumption.

Leonard was named the Executive Director for Greenpeace USA in May 2014.

Personal life
Leonard lives in the San Francisco Bay Area with her daughter Dewi, born in 1999.

References

External links
 
 
 

1964 births
Living people
Sustainability advocates
Barnard College alumni
Cornell University alumni
Anti-consumerists
Lakeside School alumni
Filmmakers from Seattle
Writers from Seattle
People associated with Greenpeace